Stinking Creek is an unincorporated community in Campbell County, Tennessee, in the United States.

History
It took its name from the nearby stream Stinking Creek. Haskel Ayers (1936-2020), businessman and politician, was born in Stinking Creek.

References

Unincorporated communities in Campbell County, Tennessee
Unincorporated communities in Tennessee